Tamils in Sri Lanka may refer to:

 Indian Tamils of Sri Lanka - a Tamil people of Indian origin living in Sri Lanka, also known as Hill Country Tamils or Up Country Tamils.
 Sri Lankan Tamils - a Tamil people of Sri Lankan origin living in Sri Lanka.